Abdilatif Abdalla (born 1946 in Mombasa) is a Kenyan writer and political activist. He was imprisoned for his support of the Kenya People's Union, and wrote the poems collected in Sauti ya Dhiki while in solitary confinement, which were subsequently awarded the Jomo Kenyatta Prize for Literature.

Early life
Abdilatif Abdalla was born in Mombasa, Kenya, in 1946, where he was brought up by his grandfather Ahmad Basheikh bin Hussein. Abdalla attended school in Faza, before undertaking further studies at the British Tutorial College. He began his political involvement after working for the Mombasa City Council as an assistant accountant, writing the pamphlet Kenya Twendapi? (Eng: Kenya, Where Are We Headed) in support of the Kenya People's Union in 1968.

Political imprisonment and writing
When the Kenyan Government of Jomo Kenyatta conducted a crackdown on KPU activists, Abdalla was imprisoned for conspiracy between 1969 and 1972. He was at first held in Kamiti Prison, and later in Shimo la Tewa Prison, where he was kept in solitary confinement. It was while imprisoned that he wrote the poems that would be collected in the 1973 work Sauti ya Dhiki. These were written in the Mombasa version of the Swahili language and published by his older brother Sheikh Abdilahi Nassir. He later explained that writing the poems in solitary confinement had kept him sane.

After he was awarded the Jomo Kenyatta Prize for Literature for Sauti ya Dhiki in 1972, he moved in exile to Tanzania. While there he worked as a senior researcher on Swahili at the University of Dar es Salaam and collaborated editing a Swahili dictionary. In 1979, he moved to London and worked for BBC Swahili department, later editing the news magazine Africa Events. Abdalla's only English language poem was published in 1988, entitled Peace, Love and Unity for Whom?. This was in response to an attempt by Daniel arap Moi's government to bribe Abdalla into no longer working with Ngũgĩ wa Thiong'o. Abdalla has since taught Swahili at Leipzig University.

Works
Utenzi wa maisha ya Adamu na Hawaa (1971)
Sauti ya Dhiki (1973)

Notes

References

External links
Interview MP3
Ann Biersteker interviews Abdilatif Abdalla (Africa Past & Present, Nov. 2014)

1946 births
Living people
Kenyan writers
Kenyan male writers
Kenyan politicians
People from Mombasa
People associated with SOAS University of London
Academic staff of Leipzig University
Academic staff of the University of Dar es Salaam
BBC people